F. B. Walgampahe (18?? - 1915) was the Basnayaka Nilame (the Lay Chief) of the Ancient Temple of Gadaladeniya in Gampola, Kandy. He was accused as an instigator of the 1915 Ceylonese Riots by Herbert Dowbiggin, the Inspector General of Police and died in the custody of the colonial authorities in the early part of the riots.

See also
1915 Ceylonese Riots

External links & References

Sri Lankan Buddhists
Sinhalese people
Prisoners and detainees of British Ceylon
People from British Ceylon
Year of birth missing
1915 deaths